The A939 'Lecht Road' connects the A96 at Nairn on the Moray Coast with the A95 Grantown on Spey, then it continues to the A93 at Ballater by way of the Grampian Mountains, passing Tomintoul and the Lecht Ski Centre. 

This road passes over four summits:
at Dava Moor 1053 ft (321m),
west of Bridge of Brown 1436 ft (438m),
at the Lecht Ski Centre 2090 ft (637m),
at the Gairnshiel Summit 1836 ft (550m).

On the old A939, now redesignated the B976 between Gairnshiel Bridge and Crathie, the road reaches 1568 ft (478m).
The A939 is regularly the first road in Great Britain closed due to snowfall between Cock Bridge and Tomintoul.

See also
List of the highest roads in Scotland

External links
 A939 road at SABRE

Mountain passes of Scotland
Roads in Scotland
Scenic routes in the United Kingdom
Transport in Highland (council area)